Annemarie Weber (11 September 1923 – 5 July 2012) was a German-born American physiologist who studied the biochemistry of muscle action. She was the daughter of the German physiologist Hans Hermann Weber who also studied muscle structure and function. 

Weber was born in Tübingen where her father worked at the university and grew up in Königsberg. Her brother Jürgen Weber (1928–2007) became a sculptor. She was often separated from family during World War II. She joined the University of Tübingen and received an MD in 1950 and then studied myosin ATPase for her doctorate. She received a Rockefeller foundation grant and spent her postdoctoral at University College London with A.V. Hill and at Harvard. She also trained under her father who had friends around the world including Albert Szent-Györgyi who had moved to the United States. She first went to Columbia University as a research associate in 1954 and became a lecturer in 1959. She became a professor at St. Louis University Medical School, Missouri in 1965 and moved to the University of Pennsylvania in 1972 where she worked until her death. Her work was on the regulation of actin. She demonstrated the role of Ca2+ ions as intracellular signals and on actin polymerization.

References 

1923 births
2012 deaths
American biochemists
University of Pennsylvania faculty
People from Tübingen
Women biochemists